Matěj Hanousek (born 2 June 1993) is a Czech professional footballer who plays as a left-back for Turkish side MKE Ankaragücü on loan from Sparta Prague. He has represented his country as a member of the national under-21 team.

Career
Having made his professional debut with Dukla Prague, Hanousek joined Jablonec in September 2015.

Career statistics

References

External links
 
 
 

Czech footballers
1993 births
Living people
Czech Republic youth international footballers
Czech Republic under-21 international footballers
Czech First League players
Ekstraklasa players
FK Dukla Prague players
FK Jablonec players
AC Sparta Prague players
Association football defenders
Footballers from Prague
Wisła Kraków players
Czech expatriate footballers
Expatriate footballers in Poland
Czech expatriate sportspeople in Poland
Gaziantep F.K. footballers
Expatriate footballers in Turkey
Czech expatriate sportspeople in Turkey
MKE Ankaragücü footballers